Baba Khani may refer to:
Baba Khani, Fars
Baba Khani, Dorud, Lorestan Province
Baba Khani, Selseleh, Lorestan Province